Armadilloniscus lindahli is a species of woodlouse in the family Detonidae. It is found in North America and Mexico.

References

Isopoda
Articles created by Qbugbot
Crustaceans described in 1905